The Norwegian Geological Society (in Norwegian: Norsk Geologisk Forening) is  a Norwegian learned society founded in 1905. Among the founders was geologist Hans Henrik Reusch, who also was the first chairman of the society.

The society publishes the journal Norwegian Journal of Geology. The Norwegian Geological Society has awarded the Reusch Medal to deserving geologists since 1926.

References

External links 

Geology societies
Geology of Norway
Scientific organisations based in Norway
Organisations based in Trondheim
Environmental organizations established in 1905
1905 establishments in Norway